FC Tobol Kurgan is a Russian football team from Kurgan. As of 2009, it plays in the Amateur Football League. It played professionally in 1960–1975, 1986–2001 and 2003–2005. They played on the second-highest level in the Soviet First League from 1960 to 1962, where their best result was 8th place in Zone 5 in 1961.

Team name history
 1960–1964: FC Stroitel Kurgan
 1965–1966: FC Trud Kurgan
 1967–1971: FC Zauralets Kurgan
 1972–1985: FC Zauralye Kurgan
 1986–1988: FC Torpedo Kurgan
 1989–1990: FC Zauralye Kurgan
 1991–1998: FC Sibir Kurgan
 1999–2000: FC Kurgan
 2000–2001: FC Spartak Kurgan
 2002–present: FC Tobol Kurgan

External links
  Team history at KLISF

 
Association football clubs established in 1960
Football clubs in Russia
1960 establishments in Russia
Sport in Kurgan, Kurgan Oblast